Anthony England (born 19 October 1986) is an English former professional rugby league footballer who last played as a  for the Bradford Bulls in the Betfred Championship.

He has previously played for the Castleford Tigers (Heritage No. 832) in National League One, and Gateshead Thunder in National League Two and the Co-operative Championship. England also played for the Dewsbury Rams and Featherstone Rovers in the Championship, and the Warrington Wolves and Wakefield Trinity in the Super League.

Background
England was born in Dewsbury, West Yorkshire, England.

Retirement
On 1 April 2021 he announced his retirement due to injury.

References

External links
Wakefield Trinity profile
Profile at thecastlefordtigers.co.uk
SL profile
In The Spotlight: Wakefield Trinity's Anthony England!

1986 births
Living people
Bradford Bulls players
Castleford Tigers players
Dewsbury Rams players
English rugby league players
Featherstone Rovers players
Newcastle Thunder players
Rugby league players from Dewsbury
Rugby league props
Wakefield Trinity players
Warrington Wolves players